Following the January 20, 1891 death of King Kalākaua in San Francisco, his embalmed body arrived at Honolulu Harbor aboard the USS Charleston, draped in black with its ensigns at half mast. His sister Liliʻuokalani was designated his successor.

The Privy Council of State of the Kingdom of Hawaii was a constitutionally-created body purposed to advise and consent to acts made by the monarch. The cabinet ministers were ex-officio members. Other privy counselors were appointed by the monarch according to his (or her) personal wishes. At an emergency meeting of Kalākaua's privy council and justices of the supreme court, they were in accord that Liliʻuokalani be installed as monarch on January 29. She did not wish to discuss affairs of state during the period of mourning, but reluctantly acquiesced, and was given the oath of office by Hawaii Supreme Court Chief Justice Albert Francis Judd. Her husband John Owen Dominis was given the title of Prince Consort.

The 1887 Constitution of the Kingdom of Hawaii had made a key change in regards to the cabinet ministers. The monarch was still empowered to appoint the ministers, but only the legislature, or a voluntary resignation, could remove them from office. After her brother's funeral, the queen demanded the resignations of his ministers, causing a legal challenge when they refused. The case was decided in her favor by the Supreme Court of the kingdom. All four cabinet members submitted their resignations, and three of the four remained on her privy council.

Below is a list of 57 individuals known to have served on the queen's privy council, all citizens and subjects of the kingdom. The advisory body was composed of men who were of Native Hawaiian descent, Euro-American descent, mixed Hawaiian and Euro-American descent, and one member of Asian-Hawaiian descent. They included the insurgents who would play an eventual role in the deposition of the queen, and also the political resistance leaders who would lead the opposition to the overthrow and attempts to annex the Hawaiian Islands to the United States. The meeting dates and the roster of individuals were gleaned from the Minutes of the Privy Council, 1881–1892 and the Hawaiian Registers and Directories for 1891, 1892 and 1893, published in Thomas G. Thrum’s Hawaiian Almanac and Annual. The century-old archived records are often spotty, and should not be considered complete.

Privy council members

See also
Liliʻuokalani's Cabinet Ministers
Kalākaua's Privy Council of State
1892 Legislative Session of the Hawaiian Kingdom
MOS Hawaii-related articles

References

Bibliography 

 

Members of Cabinet of the Hawaiian Kingdom
House of Kalākaua
Members of the Hawaiian Kingdom House of Nobles
Members of the Hawaiian Kingdom Privy Council
Overthrow of the Hawaiian Kingdom
People associated with the overthrow of the Hawaiian Kingdom